FBHS may refer to:
 Fellow of the British Horse Society, a riding instructor qualification
 Fortune Brands Home & Security, a fixture and hardware manufacturer

Schools 
 Flowery Branch High School, Flowery Branch, Georgia, United States
 Flour Bluff High School, Corpus Christi, Texas, United States
 Forest Brook High School, Houston, Texas, United States
 Fort Benton High School, Fort Benton, Montana, United States
 Fort Bragg High School, Fort Bragg, California, United States

See also 
 FBH (disambiguation)